Zogg is a surname. Notable people with the surname include:

David Zogg (1902–1977), Swiss alpine and Nordic combined skier
Florian Zogg (1900–?), Swiss cross-country skier
Julie Zogg (born 1992), Swiss snowboarder
Jon Zogg (born 1960), American football player
Onyinyechi Zogg (born 1997), Swiss-born Nigerian footballer